Salvia virgata (wand sage, southern meadow sage) is a perennial plant that is native to Asia and southeastern Europe. It is considered a noxious weed in many parts of the world.

S. virgata is sometimes included within Salvia pratensis. The ovate to oblong leaves are dull green on the top surface, with the underside covered with glands and thick hairs.

Notes

External links
IPNI listing
USDA Plants Profile

virgata
Taxa named by Nikolaus Joseph von Jacquin